Whatarangi Winiata is a New Zealand accountant, academic, and Māori leader. From 1994 to 2007, he was Chief Executive of Te Wānanga o Raukawa, a Māori tertiary education institution. He had been Professor of Accountancy at the Victoria University of Wellington from 1974. He is a former President of the Māori Party, serving from the party's creation in 2004 to 2009.

Biography 
Hokio in Manawatū is the place Winiata was born in 1935, he is affiliated with the Māori iwi Ngāti Raukawa. He was the second Māori to graduate with a degree of Bachelor of Commerce from Victoria University of Wellington in 1957.

Winiata has an MBA and PhD from the University of Michigan. He lived also in Canada working at the University of British Columbia. In about 1975 he and his family returned to New Zealand.

His work establishing and revitalising Maori language on the Kapiti Coast that saw only 100 te reo Māori speakers in 1975 to the town of Ōtaki, and home of Te Wānanga o Raukawa, being named a bilingual town, with 'Māori spoken in 50% of its homes'.Hirini Moko Mead said of Winiata he is "a leading thinker of the Māori world, and of te ao Pākehā as well."Winiata was founding President of the Māori Party to support co-leaders Tariana Turia and Pita Sharples.

Awards 
2018 - Lifetime Achievement Award, National Māori Language Awards

2022 - Te Whare Pūkenga Award, National Iwi Chairs Forum for being a 'living taonga'

Personal life 
Winiata married Francie Aratema in 1961 and they had four children.

References

 

 
 
 

Living people
Year of birth missing (living people)
New Zealand accountants
Academic staff of the Victoria University of Wellington
New Zealand Māori activists
New Zealand Māori academics
New Zealand academic administrators
20th-century New Zealand educators
21st-century New Zealand educators
Academic staff of Te Wānanga o-Raukawa
Ngāti Raukawa people
1935 births
People from Manawatū-Whanganui
University of Michigan alumni